The Zaire dwarf gecko (Lygodactylus depressus) is a species of gecko found in central Africa, specifically in Cameroon, the Central African Republic, the Republic of the Congo, and the Democratic Republic of the Congo. It is oviparous.

References

Lygodactylus
Reptiles of Cameroon
Reptiles of the Central African Republic
Reptiles of the Democratic Republic of the Congo
Reptiles of the Republic of the Congo
Taxa named by Karl Patterson Schmidt
Reptiles described in 1919